This is a list of mayors of the city of Marietta. Prior to the mayoral position the position of leadership was Chairman of the Town Meeting.

References

Marietta, Ohio
 Mayors